Cors Dyfi is a nature reserve located near to the village of Derwenlas, in the county of Powys, Wales. Located on land reclaimed from the Estuary on the south side of the River Dyfi, the reserve is under the management of the Montgomeryshire Wildlife Trust.

General site character and ecology
The site has open water, swamp, bog, wet woodland, scrub and gorse. Plants present include marsh cinquefoil Comarum palustre, purple loosestrife Lythrum salicaria, lesser spearwort Ranunculus flammula, royal fern Osmunda regalis and bog myrtle Myrica gale.

Wildlife
Ospreys, otters, red kites, peregrines and hen harriers can be found here together with green woodpeckers and nightjars.

Cors Dyfi is home to the Dyfi Osprey Project.

References

External links 

Cors Dyfi website

Geography of Powys
Nature reserves in Wales
Powys
Birdwatching sites in Wales
Bogs of Wales
Landforms of Powys